The Dragon Murder Case is a 1934 mystery film adaptation of the novel of the same name by S. S. Van Dine, starring Warren William as private detective Philo Vance, Margaret Lindsay, Lyle Talbot and Eugene Pallette, and featuring Helen Lowell, Robert McWade, Robert Barrat, Dorothy Tree, George E. Stone and Etienne Girardot.

Plot
Monty Montague disappears after diving into a natural pool of water on an estate. Several people dive in, but there is no trace of him. Philo Vance and the District Attorney come to investigate and decide to drain the pool. They are told that there are potholes near the pool, and Montague's body is found at the bottom of a very deep pothole. His body has claw marks on it, consistent with the superstition that a dragon inhabits the pool.

Cast

Warren William as Philo Vance
Margaret Lindsay as Bernice
Lyle Talbot as Leland
Eugene Pallette as Sgt. Heath
Helen Lowell as Mrs. Stamm
Robert McWade as Markham
Robert Barrat as Stamm
Dorothy Tree as Ruby

George E. Stone as Tatum
Etienne Girardot as Dr. Doremus
George Meeker as Monty Montague
Robert Warwick as Dr. Halliday
William B. Davidson as Greeff
Arthur Aylesworth as Trainor
Charles C. Wilson as Det. Hennessey

Production
Principal photography took place from May 11, 1934 to mid-June. 

The Dragon Murder Case was the first Philo Vance film to star Warren William as Vance; the character had previously been played by Basil Rathbone and William Powell.  William would not play the character again. 

H. Bruce Humberstone was not the first director considered for the film.  It was offered to Michael Curtiz, Archie Mayo, Mervyn Le Roy and Alfred Green, all of whom turned it down.

Reception
In his review in The New York Times, Mordaunt Hall found that the "denouement is scarcely satisfactory, for it is not quite clear how Mr. Vance reaches his conclusions." Also, in his opinion, "Mr. William, while he does fair work, is not as easy and smooth in the rôle as was  Mr. [William] Powell."

References

External links

1934 mystery films
American mystery films
American black-and-white films
Films based on mystery novels
Films directed by H. Bruce Humberstone
First National Pictures films
Films based on American novels
1934 crime films
Warner Bros. films
1930s English-language films
Films with screenplays by F. Hugh Herbert
1930s American films
Films scored by Bernhard Kaun
Films about missing people
Films about dragons
Philo Vance films